The Brelsford-Seese House is a one-story wood-frame house located in Dublin, Ohio. It was built around 1850 and owned by Mr. Hutchinson in 1856 and A.S. Breisfold in 1972. The vernacular-style home is said to be a station on the Underground Railroad. It was added to the National Register of Historic Places on April 11, 1979

References 

Houses on the National Register of Historic Places in Ohio
Houses completed in 1850
Dublin, Ohio
National Register of Historic Places in Franklin County, Ohio